The 2022 FIBA Under-17 Women's Basketball World Cup was an international basketball competition held in Debrecen, Hungary from 9 to 17 July 2022. It is the seventh edition of the FIBA Under-17 Women's Basketball World Cup. Sixteen national teams competed in the tournament.

The United States captured their fifth title after a finals win over Spain, while France defeated Canada to grab the bronze medal.

To be eligible for this competition, players must be born on or after 1 January 2005.

Qualified teams

1 Russia was excluded due to the 2022 Russian invasion of Ukraine and was replaced by Serbia.

Draw
The draw took place on 22 March 2022.

Seeding

Preliminary round
All times are local (UTC+2).

Group A

Group B

Group C

Group D

Final round

Bracket

Round of 16

9–16th classification playoffs

9–16th place quarterfinals
{{Basketballbox|date=15 July 2022|time=12:00|place=Oláh Gábor Sports Hall, Debrecen
|teamA= |scoreA=57
|teamB= |scoreB=67
|Q1=7–20 |Q2=12–11 |Q3=15–19 |Q4=23–17
|report=Boxscore
|points1=Yañez 13
|rebounds1=Yañez 15
|assist1=Mendoza 4
|points2=El-Shebshery 21
|rebounds2=Sallman 13
|assist2=Metwally 6
|attendance=35
|referee=James Griguol (AUS), Özge Şentürk (TUR), Mbaye Seye (SEN)
}}

13–16th place semifinals

15th place game

13th place game

9–12th place semifinals

Eleventh place game

Ninth place game

Quarterfinals

5–8th classification playoffs

5–8th place semifinals

Seventh place game

Fifth place game

Semifinals

Third place game

Final

Final ranking

Statistics and awards
Statistical leaders
Players

Points

Rebounds

Assists

Blocks

Steals

Efficiency

TeamsPointsReboundsAssistsBlocksStealsEfficiency'''

Awards
The awards were announced on 17 July 2022.

References

External links
Official website

2024
2024 in youth sport
International women's basketball competitions hosted by Mexico
2024 in basketball